Iveri Jikurauli (born March 22, 1976) is a Georgian judoka.

Achievements

References
 

1976 births
Living people
Male judoka from Georgia (country)
Judoka at the 2000 Summer Olympics
Judoka at the 2004 Summer Olympics
Olympic judoka of Georgia (country)
Universiade medalists in judo
Universiade medalists for Georgia (country)
Medalists at the 1999 Summer Universiade
20th-century people from Georgia (country)